Vella Lovell (born September 13, 1985) is an American actress, known for playing Heather Davis in The CW comedy-drama series Crazy Ex-Girlfriend as well as providing the voice of Mermista in She-Ra and the Princesses of Power, Khadija in The Big Sick, and Mikaela in Mr. Mayor.

Early life 
Lovell was born in Southern California and raised in New Mexico. She is of black, Jewish, and European descent.

Lovell attended Interlochen Arts Camp and graduated from Interlochen Arts Academy. She then went on to graduate from New York University and the Juilliard School.

Career
Lovell had minor roles in TV series Girls and Younger before joining the cast of Crazy Ex-Girlfriend in 2015. In 2017, Lovell had a supporting role in the romantic comedy The Big Sick. She also had a small role in the Netflix movie The Christmas Chronicles.

In 2018, she voiced Princess Mermista in the Netflix series She-Ra and the Princesses of Power.

In 2021, she played Mikaela in Mr. Mayor on NBC, created by Tina Fey and Robert Carlock. She also starred in the Comedy Central parody A Clusterfunke Christmas with Cheyenne Jackson, Ana Gasteyer and Rachel Dratch.

Filmography

Film

Television

Awards and nominations

References

External links
 

Living people
American television actresses
Juilliard School alumni
21st-century American actresses
American film actresses
Place of birth missing (living people)
American female models
African-American models
African-American actresses
African-American female models
1985 births
Actresses from New Mexico
Female models from New Mexico
21st-century African-American women
21st-century African-American people
20th-century African-American people
20th-century African-American women